U.S. Route 122  may refer to:
U.S. Route 122 (1926–1934) in Delaware, Pennsylvania, and New Jersey, now part of U.S. Route 202
U.S. Route 122 (1935–1963) in Pennsylvania, now part of Pennsylvania Route 10 and Pennsylvania Route 61

22-1
1